Peter Walton  may refer to:

 Peter Walton (rugby union) (born 1969), Scottish rugby player and coach
 Peter Walton (referee) (born 1959), English referee
Peter Walton, character in Alias John Preston